Roaring Spring is an unincorporated community in Trigg County, Kentucky, United States.

A post office called Roaring Spring was established in 1849, and remained in operation until 1909. The community seized its name from a nearby cave spring, that momentarily produced a roar.

Notable people
 Hugh "Riccardo" Martin, opera singer

References

Unincorporated communities in Trigg County, Kentucky
Unincorporated communities in Kentucky